Jaimito is Spanish for "little James", and can refer to:
 a Spanish-language hypochoristic for somebody called Jaime.
 the Spanish-language comical character equivalent to Little Johnny.
 Jaimito, el cartero, a character in the Mexican comedy TV series El chavo del ocho.
 the European Spanish name of Louie, one of the nephews of Donald Duck.
 Jaimito y compañía, a Spanish carton series created in 1943.
 Jaimito (magazine), a Spanish comic book published between 1944 and 1979.
 the Spanish screen name of American actor Larry Semon 
 Heimito von Doderer, Austrian writer.
 Jaimito Soares (born 2001), East Timorese footballer